The following is a discography of production by hip-hop record producer Flying Lotus.

2008

José James
 "Visions of Violet"

2009

Declaime and Flying Lotus
 "Whole Wide World"
 "Lit Up"
 "Keep It Moving"

The Grouch and Eligh – Say G&E!
 04. "Old Souls" (featuring Blu)

Oddisee – Oddisee 101
 07. "The Perch" (featuring Phonte and Tor)

2010

José James - Blackmagic

Georgia Anne Muldrow & Declaime - Mages Sages II

MosEL - Just Thinking Out Loud
 00. "Vent"

Gonjasufi – A Sufi and a Killer
 03. "Ancestors"

Williams Street Records – Adult Swim Singles Program 2010
 "Swimming" (performed with Mike Bigga)

2011

Smoke DZA – "Dear Winter"

Thundercat – The Golden Age of Apocalypse

2012

Hodgy Beats – Untitled
 03. "Lately"
 07. "Lamented"

Chance the Rapper – 10 Day
 07. "22 Offs"

Captain Murphy – Duality
 03. "Mighty Morphin' Foreskin"
 05. "Between Friends" (featuring Earl Sweatshirt)
 06. "Children of the Atom" 
 09. "The Killing Joke"
 10. "Hovercrafts and Cows"
 11. "Gone Fishing" (featuring Jeremiah Jae)
 13. "Immaculation" (featuring Azizi Gibson and Jeremiah Jae)

2013

Blu – York
 01. "Doin' Nothin'" (featuring U-God)
 02. "Everything's OK" (featuring Jack Davey)
 14. "Doin' Something" (featuring El Prez, Pac Div, U-N-I, J*Davey, Tiron and Ayomari)

Mac Miller – Watching Movies with the Sound Off
 04. "S.D.S."

Thundercat – Apocalypse
 01. "Tenfold"
 02. "Heartbreaks + Setbacks" 
 03. "The Life Aquatic"
 04. "Special Stage"
 05. "Tron Song"
 06. "Seven" 
 08. "Without You"
 09. "Lotus and the Jondy"
 10. "Evangelion"
 11. "We'll Die"
 12. "A Message for Austin/Praise the Lord/Enter the Void"

Jeremiah Jae – Bad Jokes
 04. "Oatmeal Face"

2014

Azizi Gibson - "Libras Don't Die"

Mickey Factz –  "Malfunctioning"

2015

Kendrick Lamar – To Pimp a Butterfly
 01. "Wesley's Theory" (featuring George Clinton and Thundercat)

Thundercat - The Beyond / Where the Giants Roam
 03. "Them Changes" 
 04. "Lone Wolf and Pup" 
 05. "That Moment"

2017

Thundercat - Drunk 

 02. "Captain Stupido"
 07. "Jethro"
 09. "Show You the Way" (featuring Michael McDonald & Kenny Loggins)
 16. "Where I'm Going"
 18. "Inferno"
 20. "3AM"
 21. "Drunk"

2018

Mac Miller - Swimming
 09. "Conversation Pt. 1"

2019

Danny Brown – U Know What I'm Sayin?
 09. "Negro Spiritual" (featuring JPEGMafia)

References

Production discographies
Production discography
Albums produced by Flying Lotus